Piper pingbienense is a species of plant from the genus Piper. It was discovered in South-Central china by Yunnan Sheng in 1979.

References

pingbienense
Flora of China
Plants described in 1979